Cult Hero may refer to:

a pseudonym used by an extended lineup of The Cure to release the 1979 single "I'm a Cult Hero"
Cult Hero (film), a 2022 Canadian thriller film
Cult Hero Records, an independent record label owned and operated by the rock band Voxtrot
Hero cult